Bozhidar Vasev (born 14 March 1993) is a Bulgarian professional footballer who plays as a midfielder for Spartak Varna.

Career

Botev Plovdiv
Vasev signed a contract with Botev Plovdiv in July 2013 and soon after that he was loaded the Rakovski.

Vasev returned to Botev Plovdiv for season 2014-15 and became part of the first team. The manager Velislav Vutsov decided to use him on a new position as a left-back.

2014-15
In December 2014 Velislav Vutsov was replaced by Petar Penchev. The new manager returned Vasev to his favorite position in the midfield. On 10 March 2015 Bozhidar scored his first goal in A Grupa during the 0–2 away win over the local rivals Lokomotiv Plovdiv.

2015-16
On 29 August 2015 Vasev scored a goal for the 2–1 victory over Cherno More Varna.

Two months later, on 23 October, Vasev has sent off only 5 minutes after replacing the injured Orlin Starokin. Vasev received a yellow card during the substitution for coming on the pitch without a permission from the referee. Soon after that he committed a foul and was sent off. Immediately after the game Vasev was fined, although that his team achieved 1–0 win over Pirin Blagoevgrad. After missing a match due to a ban, on 30 October, Vasev returned in the starting lineup for the away game with Slavia Sofia. In the 80th minute Slavia Sofia scored a goal after Vasev's terrible mistake, while two minutes later they scored the second goal for their 2–0 home win.

Hapoel Acre
In June 2017, Vasev joined Pirin Blagoevgrad but did not sign a professional contract because of the club's financial problems. On 6 July, he signed for 1+1 years with Israeli side Hapoel Acre.

Dunav Ruse
On 5 September 2017, Vasev signed a two-year contract with Dunav Ruse, where he joined his brother Andreas.

Spartak Varna
After 2 seasons with Minyor Pernik and becoming the top goalscorer in 2021-22 for the team, Vasev moved to the newly promoted to First League team Spartak Varna, signing a 3-years long contract.

Personal life
Bozhidar Vasev is son of the football coach Yuri Vasev. His brother Andreas Vasev is also a football player.

Stabbing
On 23 August 2011, Vasev was stabbed in the back by unknown attackers in downtown Sofia.

References

External links
 

1993 births
Living people
People from Pernik
Bulgarian footballers
Bulgaria youth international footballers
Bulgaria under-21 international footballers
Association football midfielders
First Professional Football League (Bulgaria) players
Second Professional Football League (Bulgaria) players
Israeli Premier League players
PFC Slavia Sofia players
FC Pomorie players
FC Septemvri Simitli players
OFC Pirin Blagoevgrad players
Botev Plovdiv players
Hapoel Acre F.C. players
FC Dunav Ruse players
FC Hebar Pazardzhik players
FC Tsarsko Selo Sofia players
PFC Spartak Varna players
Bulgarian expatriate footballers
Bulgarian expatriate sportspeople in Israel
Expatriate footballers in Israel